Martin Schlumpf (born 3 December 1947) is a Swiss musician, composer, conductor, improviser (double bass, saxophone and bass clarinet) and academic teacher.

Career 
He continued his studies with Boris Blacher in Berlin.

From 1977 to 2011 he was professor of music theory and improvisation at the Departement Musik of the Zürcher Hochschule der Künste (ZHdK, formerly Musikhochschule). He served the department as Konventspräsident from 1999 to 2010.

Selected works 
 Trio for flute, viola and harp, 1970
 5 Stücke für grosses Orchester (5 pieces for large orchestra), 1973
 Tenebrae for soprano, alto, baritone, mixed choir, five brass players, harpsichord and string quintet (after Paul Celan), 1976/77
 Jeux for 3 clarinets, 1979
 Ostinato II for three improvising musicians and orchestra, 1982
 "... per la quinta vox..." for viola solo, 1986
 Winterkreis for saxophone quartet, 1991
 December Rains for piano, 1992/93
 Mouvements for piano and orchestra, 1994/99
 Frühling for percussion quartet, 1995
 …aufflattern mit dunklen Gesichtern die Fledermäuse…, fall music for four female voices, 1995
 Trio for clarinet, cello and piano, 1997
 Rattaplasma 2 for clarinet and computer (Ambisonics), 2001
 Waves, concerto for cello, trumpet, string orchestra and computer (Ambisonics), 2002
 pulsar_1 for flute, clarinet, accordion, drums and computer (Ambisonics), 2006/07
 Sommerkreis for string quartet, 2007
 pulsar_2 for voice, flute, piano and computer (Ambisonics), 2009
 Streams, concerto for clarinet, bass trombone and 17 instruments, 2010
 The Five Points for clarinet and string quartet, 2012
 Spiegelbilder for viola, cello and piano, 2013
 Triple Suite, triple concerto for violin, cello, piano and orchestra, 2015

Selected recordings 

 Swiss Fusion 84 – Live (utr 4009 LP), 1984
 Noblesse galvanisée (PL 1267-20/21 2LP), Martin Schlumpf's Bermuda Viereck, 1985
 Martin Schlumpf’s Bermuda Viereck (utr 4038 CD), 1990
 Cumuli (utr 4049 CD), Martin Schlumpf's Bermuda Viereck, 1992
 Martin Schlumpf: Vier Jahreszeiten (Musikszene Schweiz CD 6129), 1996
 Conlon Nancarrow – Martin Schlumpf: Die Kunst des Tempokanons (artist.cd, ARTS 8103 2), 2004
 Timegrid_01 (tgmusic 47.101), Zweizeit, 2008
 pulsar_1 (tgmusic 47.102 / ZHdK Records 15/09), Martin Schlumpf, 2009
 Summer Circle (Navona Records, NV5873), 2012

Selected awards 
 1972 First prize in the composition competition of Zurich
 1975 First prize in the composition competition of the Tonhalle-Gesellschaft Zürich
 1979 First prize in the composition competition of Zurich
 Werkjahre of the Aargauer Kuratorium and Zürich

References

External links 
 
 
 Schlumpf Martin (in German) Musinfo - database of Swiss music
 Die Kunst des Tempokanons (in German) review in NZfM March 2005

20th-century conductors (music)
Swiss conductors (music)
Male conductors (music)
Jazz clarinetists
Swiss saxophonists
Jazz bass guitarists
1947 births
Living people
Academic staff of the Zurich University of the Arts
20th-century bass guitarists
20th-century saxophonists
21st-century saxophonists
People from Aarau
21st-century conductors (music)
21st-century clarinetists
20th-century male musicians
21st-century male musicians
Male jazz musicians